Nieszawa is a town and a commune in the Kuyavian-Pomeranian Voivodeship, in north-central Poland. As of June 30, 2014, the town has a population of 1,985 people. It is located in the historic region of Kuyavia.

History

The Statutes of Nieszawa, enacted in this town at 1454, have a significance in Polish legal and social history.

Nieszawa was granted town rights in 1460, and in the following centuries it was a royal town of the Polish Crown, administratively located in the Brześć Kujawski Voivodeship in the Greater Poland Province.

Following the joint German-Soviet invasion of Poland, which started World War II in September 1939, the town was invaded and then occupied by Germany. The Germans immediately carried mass arrests of Poles as part of the Intelligenzaktion. Nieszawa was one of the sites of executions of Poles carried out by Germany in 1939 as part of the Intelligenzaktion. In December 1939, the Germans also expelled around 1,000 Poles from the town. Further expulsions of Poles were carried out in 1940. Houses, offices, shops and workshops of expelled Poles were handed over to Germans as part of the Lebensraum policy. In 1945 the German occupation ended and the town was restored to Poland, although with a Soviet-installed communist regime, which remained in power until the Fall of Communism in the 1980s.

Sights
The most important historic landmarks and sights of the town are the Gothic Church of Saint Hedwig (High Duchess consort of Poland), built in the 15th century, which possesses rich Gothic-Renaissance-Baroque interior, the Baroque Franciscan Monastery with the Church of the Invention of the Holy Cross, the Stanisław Noakowski Museum dedicated to Polish architect and artist Stanisław Noakowski, located in his former home, and the historic market square filled with old townhouses and the town hall.

Notable people
 Stanisław Noakowski (1867-1928), Polish architect, watercolorist and art historian
 Ferdynand Antoni Ossendowski (1876–1945), Polish writer, explorer, university professor and anti-Communist activist
  (1881-1945), Polish teacher and parliamentarian

Gallery

References

External links

 Nieszawa's official website
 Official website of the local newspaper
 NKS Jagiellonka Nieszawa - local football club's website

Cities and towns in Kuyavian-Pomeranian Voivodeship
Aleksandrów County
15th-century establishments in Poland
Populated places established in the 1460s
Populated places on the Vistula
Warsaw Governorate
Warsaw Voivodeship (1919–1939)
Pomeranian Voivodeship (1919–1939)